The San Miguel River is a river of Ecuador and Peru. For much of its length it forms the international boundary between the two countries.

See also
List of rivers of Ecuador
List of rivers of Peru

References
 Rand McNally, The New International Atlas, 1993.
  GEOnet Names Server
 Water Resources Assessment of Ecuador

Rivers of Ecuador
Rivers of Peru
Ecuador–Peru border
International rivers of South America
Border rivers